Özgür is a unisex Turkish given name and a surname meaning "free" and independent. Notable people with the name include:

Given name:
İsmail Özgür Göktaş (born 1989), Turkish footballer
Özgür Bayer (born 1979), Turkish football player
Özgür Buldum (born 1976), Turkish music producer
Özgür Çek (born 1991), Turkish professional footballer
Özgür Çevik (born 1981), Turkish singer and actor
Özgür Dengiz (born 1980), Turkish serial killer and cannibal
Özgür Gürbulak (born 1981), Turkish wheelchair basketballer
Özgür İleri (born 1989), Turkish professional footballer
Özgür Kart (born 1982), Turkish football player
Özgür Öçal (born 1981), Turkish football player
Özgür Özata (born 1977), Turkish-German actor
Ozgur Uyanik, Turkish film director
Özgür Varlık (born 1979), Turkish sport shooter
Özgür Yasar (born 1981), Swedish footballer
Özgür Yılmaz (born 1986), Turkish footballer
Özgür Yılmaz (born 1977), Turkish judoka

Surname:
Alaattin Özgür (born 1965), Turkish former wrestler
Erman Özgür (born 1977), Turkish footballer
Mesut Özgür (born 1990), Turkish footballer
Nesim Özgür (born 1973), Turkish-Bulgarian footballer
Özker Özgür, leading Turkish-Cypriot politician
Semavi Özgür (born 1985), Turkish football player
Veysel Özgür (1877–1931), officer of the Ottoman Army and the Turkish Army

See also
Özgür Gündem (English: "Free Agenda"), Turkish newspaper
Ozgur Parti, Freedom and Reform Party, in the Turkish Republic of Northern Cyprus

References

Turkish-language surnames
Turkish unisex given names